The HAN International School of Business is the business school of the HAN University of Applied Sciences in Arnhem, the Netherlands. It offers Bachelor's degrees in international business, communications, logistics and management. All programmes are taught in English.


International focus
The school has agreements with about 100 international partner institutes. Cooperation agreements include student and staff exchange programmes, joint research and the development of common projects and degree programs.

Facilities
As part of HAN University of Applied Sciences, students can make use of all of the HAN's facilities in Arnhem and Nijmegen.

Academics

Bachelors
 Communication
 International Business and Management Studies
 International Business (Starting February 2018)

International Student Association
The International Student Association (ISA) creates leisure activities such as parties and trips to other cities.

Student Management Association
The Student Management Association (SMA) is known for organizing events such as: guest lectures, workshops and theme days/weeks.

References

Business schools in the Netherlands
Education in Arnhem